Richard Stanley Allen (August 8, 1939 – December 26, 2017) was an American poet, literary critic and academic.

Early life

The son of Richard Sanders Allen, a writer and historian, and Doris (née Bishop), a postmaster, Allen was educated at the College of Liberal Arts at Syracuse University (A.B. 1961), then at the Brown University graduate school (M.A. 1964), and subsequently undertook two years of post-Masters work.

Career
Having been a teaching assistant at Brown whilst studying, he went on to teach creative writing and English literature at Wright State University from 1964-8, then the University of Bridgeport. When he retired, he was the Charles A. Dana Endowed Chair Professor at the University of Bridgeport.

From July 1, 2010, through June 30, 2015, he served as Connecticut's poet laureate. During this time he wrote the poem "Solace" in remembrance of the victims of the shootings at the Sandy Hook Elementary School in Newton, CT. This poem was subsequently set to music by the composer William Bolcom.

Allen was co-editor of several anthologies of science fiction and science fiction criticism, and his book, Overnight in the Guest House of the Mystic, was a finalist for the 1984 National Book Critics Circle Award for Poetry. He was one of the founders of the Expansive Poetry movement. His influences included Ralph Waldo Emerson, A.E. Housman, Ben Jonson, Robert Frost

His poems appeared in many journals, including Poetry, The Atlantic Monthly, The New Republic, The New Yorker, The American Poetry Review, Ploughshares, The Kenyon Review, The Hudson Review, The Massachusetts Review,  The Yale Review, Boulevard,  The Gettysburg Review,  JuxtaProse Literary Magazine, and The New Criterion. Allen died on December 26, 2017, after a heart attack.

Awards and recognition
 Finalist, National Book Critics Circle Award for Poetry, Overnight in the Guest House of the Mystic, 1984
 Robert Frost Prize
 Hart Crane Poetry Prize
 Pushcart Prize
 New Criterion Poetry Prize, This Shadowy Place, 2013.
 Poems included in:
 The Best American Poetry volumes for 1991, 1994, 1998,  1999 and 2006
 Scanning the Century: The Penguin Book of the Twentieth Century in Poetry (1999)
 Poetry writing fellowships:
 National Endowment for the Arts
 Ingram Merrill Foundation

Bibliography

Poetry 
Collections
 
 Regions With No Proper Names (St. Martin's Press, 1975)
 Overnight in the Guest House of the Mystic (Louisiana State University Press, 1984)
 Flight and Pursuit (Louisiana State University Press, 1987)
 Ode to the Cold War: Poems New and Selected (Sarabande, 1997)
 The Day Before: New Poems (Sarabande Books, 2003)
  Present Vanishing (Sarabande Books, 2008)
  This Shadowy Place (St. Augustines Press, 2014)
  Zen Master Poems (Wisdom Publications, 2016)

List of poems

See also

 Expansive Poetry

Notes

External links
 Dick Allen's Home Page
 Online biographical sketch
 Essay on "Expansive poetry" by Dick Allen
 "A Day in the Life of Dick Allen", Cortland Review

Sources
Dick Allen

Poems online
 "For My 60th Birthday" and "Tone Poem In A Small Forest Clearing"
 "On Tenterhooks"
 "The Weeks Before"
 "The Lost Children", "Skeletonics for Poets and Others"
 "As If I Wasn't There"
 "Elvis," "Rats"
 "France"
 "Grandfather"

1939 births
2017 deaths
The Atlantic (magazine) people
Poets Laureate of Connecticut
Poets from Connecticut
Poets from New York (state)
University of Bridgeport
Writers from Troy, New York